Indonesian nationalism is an ideology that arose during the Dutch colonial era in the Dutch East Indies which called for the colony's independence and unification as an independent and sovereign nation. This period of nationalist development under colonial rule is often called the Indonesian National Awakening. After Indonesia declared independence in 1945 and was recognized as independent of the Netherlands following the 1949 Indonesian National Revolution, Indonesian nationalism persisted as a set of ideologies supporting the continued independence and development of the newly formed country. Because of the multiethnic nature of Indonesia, Indonesian nationalism does not consist of advocacy for a single ethnic group, and at times has manifested as civic nationalism, religious nationalism, and left-wing nationalism. Some of those forms are exemplified in Indonesia's national motto Bhinneka Tunggal Ika which means "Out of many, one" in Old Javanese, in the country's foundational ideology of Pancasila, or in contemporary laws which guarantee ethnic and religious diversity.

Background
Nationalism grew in Indonesia starting after the emergence of Islamic Unions. Budi Oetomo, which was formed earlier, was an "elite" organization so that it did not contribute to fostering nationalism throughout society. The Sarekat Islam (Islamic Union) made various efforts in fostering nationalism throughout the Dutch East Indies at that time.

History

The first nationalist movement in Indonesia was recorded back to the first half of the 20th century, during that time many native Indonesians of the Dutch East Indies began to develop consciousness as one nation. Nationalism in Indonesia grew drastically after the establishment of the Dutch Ethical Policy.

See also
Indonesians
Pribumi
Nusantara

References

Further reading
 

Nationalism in Asia